Jan van Beekum (16 August 1918 in The Hague - 29 November 2001 in Dieren) was a Dutch Composer and Conductor.

At age 11 he played the clarinet in various local brass bands around the Hague. He studied at the Royal Conservatory in his hometown, studying Clarinet, Music Theory and Piano and graduated 1945th in 1945.

After a while he was clarinetist with the Gelders Orchestra (then Arnhem Orchestra Association). At the same time he continued his studies as a conductor. As a conductor, he undertook the leadership for two orchestras. He has also served in the Dutch broadcasting company VARA as a judge of singing competitions.

As a composer he has created works for various ensembles, study literature and wind band works. He wrote several pedagogical works.
In addition, he regularly acted as a judge in the singing competitions broadcast TV and was also a music consultant for the Association of Workers' Singing Societies. He also worked for different occupations, did educational work, and especially military and brass music.

Works
Works for wind band
1978 Trumpets in a hurry
1980 Adspirantissimo
Adspirantenmars
Adspirantenwals
Adspirantentango
Adspirantenfoxtrot
1980 Russian Rhapsody
1981 Krontjong Rhapsody
1982 Fair Play
1982 Music for a Ceremony
"Trumpet Tune" de Maurice Greene
"Air" de Johann Sebastian Bach
"March" en Ludwig van Beethoven
"Festive March from Joshua de Georg Friedrich Handel
1988 Music by Candelight
1989 Spanish Impressions
Paso Doble-
Habanera
Spanish Waltz
Beguine
1992 A Country Dance Party
Three funny songs for choir and brass band
Predominant wave
When economic crowns
Beautiful hiking is

Bibliography
Wolfgang Suppan, Armin Suppan: Das Neue Lexikon des Blasmusikwesens, 4th edition, Freiburg-Tiengen, Blasmusikverlag Schulz GmbH, 1994,  Auflage, Freiburg-Tiengen, Blasmusik Schulz Verlag GmbH, 1994, 
Paul E. Paul E. Bierley, William H. Bierley, William H. Rehrig: The heritage encyclopedia of band music : composers and their music, Westerville, Ohio: Integrity Press, 1991,  Rehrig: The heritage encyclopedia of band music: composers and Their Music, Westerville, Ohio: Integrity Press, 1991, 

1918 births
2001 deaths
Dutch composers
Royal Conservatory of The Hague alumni
Musicians from The Hague